St. Scholastica Academy or St. Scholastica's College may refer to:
St. Scholastica Academy (Chicago, Illinois)
St. Scholastica Academy (Covington, Louisiana)
St. Scholastica's Academy, Pampanga in San Fernando, Pampanga, Philippines
St. Scholastica's Academy of Marikina in Marikina, Philippines